This is a list of all managers who have appeared in the FIFA Women's World Cup, the most prestigious tournament for national teams in association football.

In total, over 100 individuals have managed a team in at least one match in the World Cup. Even Pellerud is the manager who has taken part in the most editions of the tournament, five from 1991 to 2015. Pellerud also holds the records for both most matches managed (25) and most matches won (16).

Seven managers have won the World Cup, with Jill Ellis being the only one to do so twice, in 2015 and 2019 with United States. The first person who had the roles of both a player and a manager in the tournament is April Heinrichs, who played for United States in 1991 and then coached them in 2003.

The youngest manager to appear in the competition is Vanessa Arauz, who managed Ecuador at age 26 in 2015, while the oldest is Paulo Gonçalves, who was in charge of Brazil at age 66 in 2003.

While many of the participating nations have on one or more occasions employed foreign managers for the World Cup, the four teams with the most appearances, Brazil, Germany, Japan, and Sweden have always been led by natives. On the other side of the spectrum, New Zealand is the team with the most participations always coached by foreigners – five, always with managers coming from United Kingdom.

By team
The teams are listed in decreasing order of number of appearances in the World Cup.

Brazil

Germany

Japan

Nigeria

Norway

Sweden

United States

Australia

Canada

China PR

England

New Zealand

Denmark

France

North Korea

Argentina

Ghana

Italy

Mexico

South Korea

Cameroon

Colombia

Netherlands

Russia

Spain

Thailand

Chile

Chinese Taipei

Costa Rica

Ecuador

Equatorial Guinea

Ivory Coast

Jamaica

Scotland

South Africa

Switzerland

By individual (multiple tournaments)
Key: ; ; ; ; ; .

As per statistical convention in football, matches decided in extra time are counted as wins and losses, while matches decided by penalty shoot-outs are counted as draws.

References

FIFA Women's World Cup-related lists
Lists of association football managers